Alice Yaeger Kaplan (June 22, 1954) is an American literary critic, translator, historian, and educator. She is the Sterling Professor of French and Director of the Whitney Center for the Humanities at Yale University.

Biography
Alice Yaeger Kaplan was born on June 22, 1954, in Minneapolis, the daughter of Sidney J. Kaplan, an attorney, and Leonore Kaplan, a social worker.

In 1973, she did a year of study at the Université de Bordeaux III in Bordeaux, France. She obtained her BA in French at the University of California at Berkeley in 1975 and her PhD in French at Yale University in 1981. Before her arrival at Yale, she was the Gilbert, Louis and Edward Lehrman Professor of Romance Studies and Professor of Literature and History at Duke University and founding director of the Center for French and Francophone Studies there. She is the author of Reproductions of Banality: Fascism, Literature, and French Intellectual Life (1986); French Lessons: A Memoir (1993); The Collaborator: The Trial and Execution of Robert Brasillach (2000); and The Interpreter (2005), about racial injustice in the American army witnessed by Louis Guilloux. In March 2012, Kaplan's book about the Paris years of Jacqueline Bouvier, Susan Sontag, and Angela Davis, Dreaming in French, was published by the University of Chicago Press. A French edition of Dreaming in French, entitled Trois Américaines à Paris: Jacqueline Bouvier Kennedy, Susan Sontag, Angela Davis, was published by Éditions Gallimard in October 2012, translated by Patrick Hersant.

Kaplan is also the translator into English of Louis Guilloux's novel OK, Joe, 's Madame Proust: A Biography, and three books by Roger Grenier: Piano Music for Four Hands, Another November, and The Difficulty of Being a Dog.

Kaplan's research interests include autobiography and memory, translation in theory and practice, literature and the law, twentieth-century French literature, French cultural studies, and post-war French culture. Her recent undergraduate courses include courses on Camus, Proust, and Céline; theories of the archive; French national identity; “The Experience of Being Foreign”; and “Literary Trials.” Upcoming courses include “The Modern French Novel” (with Maurice Samuels) and a film course on French cinema of the Occupation. She currently sits on the editorial board at South Atlantic Quarterly and on the usage panel for the American Heritage Dictionary, and is a member of the American Academy of Arts and Sciences. She is represented by the Marly Rusoff Literary Agency.

Awards 
The Collaborator was awarded the 2001 Los Angeles Times Book Award in History and was a finalist for the National Book Award and National Book Critic’s Circle awards. The Interpreter was the recipient of the 2005 Henry Adams Prize from the Society for History in the Federal Government, and French Lessons was nominated for the 1993 National Books Critics Circle Award (for autobiography and biography). She was the recipient of a fellowship from the John Simon Guggenheim Memorial Foundation in 1994.

References

External links
 Faculty Homepage
 Sterling Professor Appointment: https://news.yale.edu/2020/01/15/alice-kaplan-appointed-sterling-professor-french
 Yale Office of Public Relations & Communications: 'Alice Kaplan Is Appointed the John M. Musser Professor'
 University of Chicago Press author page
 'Translation: The Biography of an Art Form' essay by Alice Kaplan
 Video interview with The Nation on Dreaming in French
 Recent articles in The Nation: "Ghostly Demarcations: On Ramon Fernandez", "La Zone Grise" (on novels concerning the World War 2 Occupation of France and the mass deportation of Jews during the period), and "Love in the Ruins: Review of Irène Némirovsky's Suite Française.
 Review of Susan Sontag's Reborn in French newspaper Libération (in French)
 Excerpt from The Collaborator and Interview
 Dreaming in French Reading Group Q&A
 Audio Interview on The Collaborator at The New York Times
 Excerpt from The Interpreter
 Macalester College talk on The Interpreter from C-SPAN's BookTV
 Steve Moyer's review of The Interpreter

1954 births
Yale University faculty
Duke University faculty
Living people
21st-century American historians
21st-century American women writers
American women historians
Vassar College alumni
American translation scholars
21st-century American translators